= Stylus Magazine =

Defunct online music and film magazine

- Website type: Music and movie webzine
- Available in: English
- Owner: Todd Burns
- Creator: Todd Burns
- Launched: 2002; 24 years ago

Stylus Magazine was an American online music and film magazine, launched in 2002 and co-founded by Todd L. Burns. It featured long-form music journalism, four daily music reviews, movie reviews, podcasts, an MP3 blog, and a text blog.

Additionally, Stylus had daily features like "The Singles Jukebox", which looked at pop singles from around the globe, and "Soulseeking", a column focused on personal responses in listening. Even though they never reached the readership of other music magazines such as PopMatters or Pitchfork, they still had a very consistent and fired-up audience. In 2006, the site was chosen by the Observer Music Monthly as one of the Internet's 25 most essential music websites.

Stylus closed as a business on 31 October 2007. On 4 January 2010, with the blessing of former editor Todd Burns, Stylus senior writer Nick Southall launched The Stylus Decade, a website with a new series of lists and essays reviewing music from the previous ten years. It is now also defunct. The Singles Jukebox relaunched with many of the same writers as a stand-alone website in March 2009 and continues today.

== Reception ==
Stylus received positive attention from critics for its analytical depth and the breadth of its musical coverage. The New York Observer described it as a "respected online music publication" that "built a name for itself among music specialists interested in rigorous, and often personal, criticism of little-known artists." Retrospective commentary has also noted that the magazine often covered "more obscure and deserving artists with less snark and narcissism" compared to some of its better-known contemporaries. Its inclusion on the Observer Music Monthly list of the Internet's "25 most essential music websites" in 2006 further highlighted its standing within mid-2000s digital music criticism.
